The Philadelphia Phillies are a Major League Baseball team based in Philadelphia, Pennsylvania. They  are a member of the Eastern Division of Major League Baseball's National League. The team has played officially under two names since beginning play in 1883: the current moniker, as well as the "Quakers", which was used in conjunction with "Phillies" during the team's early history. The team was also known unofficially as the "Blue Jays" during the World War II era. Since the franchise's inception,  players have made an appearance in a competitive game for the team, whether as an offensive player (batting and baserunning) or a defensive player (fielding, pitching, or both).

Of those  Phillies, 202 have had surnames beginning with the letter M. Two of those players have been inducted into the Baseball Hall of Fame: left fielder Tommy McCarthy, who played for the Phillies from 1886 to 1887; and second baseman Joe L. Morgan, who played for Philadelphia nearly a century later, in 1983. Three players on this list are members of the Philadelphia Baseball Wall of Fame. Garry Maddox was the Phillies' center fielder for twelve seasons (1975–1986), stealing 248 bases and notching 62 triples. Left fielder Sherry Magee played 11 seasons (1904–1914) in Philadelphia, amassing a .299 batting average, and Tug McGraw pitched from the Phillies' bullpen as closer and setup man for 10 years, amassing 94 saves and recording the final out (a strikeout of Willie Wilson) in the 1980 World Series. Two Phillies on this list hold franchise records: George McQuillan's 1.79 earned run average (ERA) is the best mark among qualifying pitchers, and José Mesa recorded 112 saves in his four seasons with Philadelphia.

Among the 115 batters in this list, second baseman Benny Meyer has the highest batting average (1.000); he hit safely in his only at-bat with the Phillies. Other players with an average about .300 include Art Madison (.353 in one season), Don McCormack (.400 in one season), Irish Meusel (.308 in four seasons), Doc Miller (.307 in two seasons),  René Monteagudo (.301 in one season), and Johnny Moore (.329 in four seasons). Magee's 75 home runs and 886 runs batted in lead all members of this list.

Of this list's 89 pitchers, Chuck Malone, Paul Masterson, and Roger McKee share the best win–loss record, in terms of winning percentage; each won one game and lost none in his Phillies career. Erskine Mayer accounted for 76 victories in his 7 seasons with Philadelphia, and Hugh Mulcahy leads all pitchers in this list with 89 defeats. Brett Myers' 986 strikeouts in 8 years are the best total in that category. Brad Moore has the lowest earned run average (ERA) among pitchers in this list, with a 1.08 mark amassed over two seasons; two position players—McCarthy and first baseman Art Mahan—each have 0.00 ERAs in their only Phillies pitching appearances. Kevin Millwood and Terry Mulholland are two of the ten Phillies pitchers who have thrown no-hitters; Mulholland threw his on August 15, 1990, and Millwood accomplished the feat on April 27, 2003.

Two Phillies have made 30% or more of their Phillies appearances as both pitchers and position players. Al Maul batted .282 with five extra-base hits as a left fielder while amassing a 6–5 record and a 5.81 ERA as a pitcher. Elmer Miller allowed 18 runs as a pitcher while notching a .237 average as a right fielder.

Footnotes
Key
 The National Baseball Hall of Fame and Museum determines which cap a player wears on their plaque, signifying "the team with which he made his most indelible mark". The Hall of Fame considers the player's wishes in making their decision, but the Hall makes the final decision as "it is important that the logo be emblematic of the historical accomplishments of that player’s career".
 Players are listed at a position if they appeared in 30% of their games or more during their Phillies career, as defined by Baseball-Reference. Additional positions may be shown on the Baseball-Reference website by following each player's citation.
 Franchise batting and pitching leaders are drawn from Baseball-Reference. A total of 1,500 plate appearances are needed to qualify for batting records, and 500 innings pitched or 50 decisions are required to qualify for pitching records.
 Statistics are correct as of the end of the 2010 Major League Baseball season.

Table
Anderson Machado is listed by Baseball-Reference as a shortstop, but never appeared in a game in the field for the Phillies.
Frank Mahar is listed by Baseball-Reference without a position; he appeared in one career game on August 29, 1902.
Tom Maher is listed by Baseball-Reference without a position; he appeared in one career game in April 1902 without making a plate appearance.
George McAvoy is listed by Baseball-Reference without a position; he appeared in one career game on July 17, 1914.
Hughie Miller is listed by Baseball-Reference as a first baseman, but never appeared in a game in the field for the Phillies.
Bob Molinaro is listed by Baseball-Reference as an outfielder, but never appeared in a game in the field for the Phillies.

References
General

Inline citations

M